Fenn typically appears as a surname.  Occasionally it appears as a middle name, pen name or name of a fictional character.

Notable people with the name Fenn

As a surname 
Courtenay Hughes Fenn (1866–1927), American-Chinese Presbyterian missionary and father of Henry Courtenay Fenn
E. Hart Fenn (1856–1939), American national politician
Ellenor Fenn (1743–1813), English writer
George Manville Fenn (1831–1909), English author
Geraldine Fenn (1912–1989), American professor
Harry Fenn (1845–1911), English-American landscape illustrator
Henry Courtenay Fenn (1894–1978), Chinese-American academic and son of Courtenay Hughes Fenn
Hugh Fenn (died 1409), English official from Norfolk who served under Richard II and Henry IV
Hugh Fenn (died 1476), English official from Norfolk who served under Henry VI and Edward IV
Jaine Fenn, British science fiction author
Jane Fenn Hoskens (1694–1794), English-American Quaker author
Joanne Fenn (born 1974), English running athlete
John Fenn (antiquarian) (1739–1794), English antiquarian who edited and published the Paston Letters
John Fenn (chemist) (1917–2010), American co-recipient of the Nobel Prize in Chemistry in 2002
John Fenn (pirate) (died 1723), English pirate
John Fenn (priest) (died 1615), English Roman Catholic priest and writer
Lionel Fenn, pen name of American writer Charles L. Grant (1942–2006)
Neale Fenn (born 1977), English-Irish footballer
Nicholas Fenn (1936–2016), British diplomat
Rick Fenn (born 1953), English rock guitarist
Sereno Peck Fenn (1844–1927), American entrepreneur
Sherilyn Fenn (born 1965), American actress
Stephen Southmyd Fenn (1820–1892), American national politician
W. J. Fenn (1862–1961), illustrator

As a middle name 
 Anthony Fenn Kemp (1773–1868), English-Australian soldier

Fictional characters
Fenn, character in Wilbur Smith's novel The Quest
Fenn Rau, one of the Mandalorians from Star Wars fiction
Fenn Shysa, another Mandalorian from Star Wars fiction